Tetracha brzoskai is a species of tiger beetle that was described by Naviaux in 2007, and is endemic to Mexico.

References

Beetles described in 2007
Endemic insects of Mexico
Beetles of North America
Cicindelidae